Akciabrski District, Akciabrski Rajon is an administrative subdivision, a raion of Gomel Region, in southern Belarus, with capital Akciabrski.

Its rural territory includes 8 selsoviets (rural districts): Акцябрскі, Валосавіцкі, Ламавіцкі, Любанскі, Ляскавіцкі, Парэцкі, Пратасаўскі, Чырвонаслабодскі.

Demographics
At the time of the Belarus Census (2009), Akciabrski Raion had a population of 15,989. Of these, 95.1% were of Belarusian, 2.8% Russian and 1.0% Ukrainian ethnicity. 90.8% spoke Belarusian and 7.6% Russian as their native language.

External links
 Akciabrski Raion administrative website

 
Districts of Gomel Region